Ivanili Heights (‘Ivanilski Vazvisheniya’ \i-va-'nil-ski v&z-vi-'she-ni-ya\) are the heights extending 10 km in north-south direction and 7.5 km wide, rising to 1434 m (Stargel Peak) on Oscar II Coast in Graham Land.  They are bounded by Brenitsa Glacier to the west and Rogosh Glacier to the east, and linked by Okorsh Saddle to Foster Plateau to the north.  The feature is named after the settlement of Ivanili in Northern Bulgaria.

Location
British mapping in 1978.

Maps
 British Antarctic Territory.  Scale 1:200000 topographic map.  DOS 610 Series, Sheet W 64 60.  Directorate of Overseas Surveys, Tolworth, UK, 1978.
 Antarctic Digital Database (ADD). Scale 1:250000 topographic map of Antarctica. Scientific Committee on Antarctic Research (SCAR), 1993–2016.

References
 Ivanili Heights. SCAR Composite Antarctic Gazetteer.
 Bulgarian Antarctic Gazetteer. Antarctic Place-names Commission. (details in Bulgarian, basic data in English)

External links
Ivanili Heights. Copernix satellite image

Mountains of Graham Land
Oscar II Coast
Bulgaria and the Antarctic